American Thunder may refer to:

 American Thunder (TV series), a television series aired on Speed channel
 American Thunder (roller coaster), a roller coaster of Six Flags St. Louis
 American Thunder (magazine), a short-lived 2004 American magazine